Michael J. G. Gleissner (born 1969 in Regensburg, Germany) is an entrepreneur, film producer, director, screenwriter, and actor.

Career

Germany/USA
In 1989 Gleissner launched his first e-commerce company Telebuch (Tele Book) in Regensburg, co-founded with Christian Jagodzinski. In 1996 he served as managing director of the ABC Book Service office in Florida. In 1998, Telebuch and its subsidiary ABC Book Service GmbH were acquired by Amazon.com, after which Gleissner served two years as vice president of their US Operations. Gleissner also started the hosting company "WWW-Service GmbH" in Germany which was later acquired by Verio (later NTT).

Asia
In 2001, Gleissner moved several of his companies to Asia, among them Bigfoot Communications and Cleverlearn Inc. In 2002 he began Bigfoot Entertainment to finance and develop video productions for various markets. He applied for Philippine citizenship in 2006.

Gleissner currently claims to be a property developer in Southeast Asia and the United States along with developing entertainment projects under the Bigfoot Group of companies.

Filmography

Gleissner's credits include executive producer, actor, and photographer on numerous films and video productions. Irreversi marked Gleissner's directorial debut, produced in both English and Mandarin simultaneously filming two versions with separate casts.

Producer
 The Dogwalker (2001)
 Nautical Angels (2005) (TV)
 3 Needles (2005)
 Fashion TV Asia (2006)
 USS Cooper: Return to Ormoc Bay (2006)
 Falling For Grace (2006)
 The Curiosity of Chance (2006)
 Hui lu (2007) (and as director and screenwriter)
 Shanghai Kiss (2007)
 Hollywood Boot Camp (2007)
 You Me and Captain Longbridge (2008)
 Bigfoot TV (2008) (TV)
 Midnight Movie (2008)
 Within (2009)
   Fashion One (2010) (TV)
 Irreversi (2010) (and as director and screenwriter)
 Midnight Movie: the Killer Cut (2010)
 Model Yoga (2011) (TV)
 Model Workout (2011) (TV)
 Underwater Action (2011) (TV) (and as photographer)
 Deep Gold (2011) (and as director and screenwriter)
 The Girl With No Number (2011) (and as director)

Actor
 The Curiosity of Chance (2006) as Sasha
 Fashion TV Asia (2006) (as himself)
 Hui lu (2007) as Charlie
 Shanghai Kiss (2007) as Frank
 Midnight Movie (2008) as Chief
 Within (2009) as Paul
 Irreversi (2010) as Charlie
 Deep Gold (2011) as Benny Simpson
 The Girl With No Number (2011) as Bergmann (as well as director)

References

External links
 
 

1969 births
Living people
Businesspeople from Bavaria
German male film actors
Mass media people from Bavaria
Filipino film producers
21st-century Filipino businesspeople
People from Regensburg
German emigrants to the Philippines